Sergey Lishtvan (born November 5, 1970) is a Belarusian wrestler, born in Minsk. At the 1996 Summer Olympics he won the silver medal in the men's Greco-Roman Heavyweight (90–100 kg) category. He has also competed at the 2000 and 2004 Summer Olympics, but has not won another medal.

References

External links
 

1970 births
Living people
Sportspeople from Minsk
Belarusian male sport wrestlers
Wrestlers at the 1996 Summer Olympics
Wrestlers at the 2000 Summer Olympics
Wrestlers at the 2004 Summer Olympics
Olympic wrestlers of Belarus
Olympic silver medalists for Belarus
Olympic medalists in wrestling
Medalists at the 1996 Summer Olympics
21st-century Belarusian people
20th-century Belarusian people